The Visible Men are an American pop band formed in 1999, consisting of Dustin Lanker (vocals, keyboards), Dan Schmid (bass guitar), Jordan Glenn (drums) and later Jimi Russel (guitar).

Biography
The Visible Men initially formed in the fall of 1999 as a side project for Cherry Poppin' Daddies members Dustin Lanker and Dan Schmid, both wanting to write and perform songs in a more experimental vein than what they had been doing with the Daddies. The band played their first show in November 2000, aided by Daddies drummer Tim Donahue, who remained with the band until he left to tour with Yngwie Malmsteen the following year. The group recorded a few demos and played a number of shows both with and without drummers until they were eventually offered a deal by indie record label Leisure King Productions, who persuaded Lanker and Schmid to take on a full-time drummer, leading to the addition of Jordan Glenn.

The band's debut album, the minimalist acoustic and piano-driven In Socks Mode, was released in 2002. Their second release, Love:30, followed three years later. In contrast to In Socks Mode, Love:30 had a stronger psychedelic slant, utilizing a fuller sound and more instruments, including organ, electric guitar and accordion.

The Visible Men toured extensively throughout 2005 and 2006, primarily in Oregon and Washington, though they also embarked on tours through California, the Southwest and the majority of the Northwestern United States. In February 2003, the group performed The Who Sell Out at John Henry's in Eugene.

In 2006, the band recruited guitarist Jimi Russel and announced that they were working on new material that, according to Lanker, was "influenced by 70s and 80s rock, but [had] the same pop influence".

The Visible Men went on hiatus in 2007, and by 2009 the band's website had been disabled. Despite a one-off show on November 27, 2009, at John Henry's in Eugene, there has been no official announcement as to whether the group will continue recording or performing in the future.

Members
Dustin Lanker – vocals, keyboards/piano
Dan Schmid – bass
Jordan Glenn – drums
Jimi Russell – guitar (2006 - )
Tim Donahue – drums (2000–2001, occasional studio recordings)

Discography

References

External links
The Visible Men at Bandcamp.com

Musical groups established in 1999
Musical groups from Eugene, Oregon
American power pop groups
American pop rock music groups
1999 establishments in Oregon